Haselbach is a municipality in the district of Straubing-Bogen in Bavaria, Germany.

Geography
Haselbach is located in the southern outskirts of the Bavarian Forest, approximately 11 kilometres (6,8 miles) north of the river Danube. The municipality comprises the village of Haselbach as well as 49 other named districts.

History
The village of Haselbach was first mentioned in 1130 and for centuries belonged to the estates of the Oberalteich monastery. At the end of the 17th century, the Danse-Macabre chapel, which today is the village's landmark and represented in the coat of arms, was built in the churchyard surrounding St. James' church. The municipality in its current form was established in 1818 in the course of administrative reforms in the kingdom of Bavaria.

After World War II, Haselbach vastly expanded from a loose accumulation of farmhouses to a coherent village. The population figure rose from well below 1000 after World War II to currently over 1900.

References

Straubing-Bogen